The 1200s began on January 1, 1200, and ended on December 31, 1209.

Significant people

References

External links